Ellac (died in 454 AD) was the oldest son of Attila (434–453) and Kreka. After Attila's death in 453 AD, his Empire crumbled and its remains were ruled by his three sons, Ellac, Dengizich and Ernak. He ruled shortly, and died at the Battle of Nedao in 454 AD. Ellac was succeeded by brothers Dengizich and Ernak.

History
In 448 or 449 AD, as Priscus recounts "Onegesius along with the eldest of Attila's children, had been sent to the Akateri, a Scythian [Hunnic] people, whom he was bringing into an alliance with Attila". As the Akatziroi tribes and clans were ruled by different leaders, emperor Theodosius II tried with gifts to spread animosity among them, but the gifts were not delivered according to rank, Kouridachos, warned and called Attila against fellow leaders. So Attila did, Kardach stayed with his tribe or clan in their own territory, while the rest of the Akatziroi became subjected to Attila. Attila "desired to make his eldest son their king, and so sent Onegesios to do it". Onegesios returned with Ellac, who "had taken a spill and broken his right hand". Beside becoming king of the Akatziri, Ellac also governed "the other nations who dwell in Pontic Scythia".

Priscus also mentions the number of sons "Onegesios was seated on a chair to the right of the king's couch, and opposite Onegesios two [Dengizich and Ernak] of Attila's children were sitting on a chair. The eldest [Ellac] was seated on Attila's couch, not near him but at the edge, looking at the ground out of respect for his father".

After the rites of Attila's death in 453, according to Jordanes in Getica, the sons Ellac, Dengizich and Ernak (but possibly existed also other sons who pretended the throne): 

A coalition of Germanic tribes, led by Ardaric, king of the Gepids, revolted against such slavery treatment, and "so they were armed for mutual destruction. War was waged in Pannonia, next to a river called Nedao. Various nations Attila had held in his sway came into combat there ... Goths, Gepids, Rugii, Suavi, Huns, Alans and Heruli". By "slavery" status is considered the pay of tributes and military service. There were many "grim clashes", but unexpected victory fell to the Gepids. Ardaric and his allies annihilated nearly 30,000 Huns and their allies. In the battle Attila's oldest son, Ellac, died. According to Priscus: 

Jordanes recounts:

"When Ellac was slain, his remaining brothers were put to fight near the shore of the Sea of Pontus where we have said the Goths settled. And so yielded the Huns to whom the whole world was once thought to yield: their disintegration was so calamitous that a nation which, with their forces united, used to terrify, when divided, tumbled down ... Many nations, by sending embassies, came to Roman lands and were welcomed by the emperor Marcian ... Now when the Goths saw the Gepids defending for themselves the territory of the Huns, and the people of the Huns dwelling again in their ancient abodes, they preferred to ask for lands from the Roman Empire, rather than invade the lands of others with dangers to themselves. So they received Pannonia".

After the battle Attila's largely Germanic subject tribes started to reassert their independence. However, it was not sudden, and not all freed themselves. The Huns "turned in flight and sought the parts of Scythia which border on the stream of the river Danaber, which the Huns call in their own tongue Var". Hernak "chose a home in the most distant part of Scythia Minor". Not all Huns immediately left the Pannonian Basin, yet only Middle Danube. Some Huns remained in Dacia Ripensis i.e. Lower Danube, Moesia and Thrace.

Etymology
Several scholars derive Ellac from a word akin to Old Turkic älik / ilik / ilig ("prince, ruler, king), which derives from *el (realm) + lä-g (to rule, the rule). The name thus appears to be a title rather than a personal name.

References

Sources

 
 
 
 
 
 

Hunnic rulers
5th-century monarchs in Europe
5th-century Hunnic rulers
454 deaths
Year of birth unknown
Monarchs killed in action